Michal Šulla (born 15 July 1991) is a Slovak professional footballer who currently plays for Slovan Bratislava.

Spartak Myjava
He made his professional Corgoň Liga debut for Spartak Myjava against Tatran Prešov on 1 September 2012. Myjava won 2-0.

International career
Šulla was called up for two unofficial friendly fixtures in January 2017. He made his debut on 8 January 2017 against Uganda, conceding two goals in the first half - by Moses Oloya (6th minute) and Farouk Miya (14th minute). Slovakia went on to lose 1–3. Šulla did not play in the 0–6 loss against Sweden later that week.

He earned another cap in the final match of the 2018 King's Cup, on 25 March 2018, in a 3–2 victory over Thailand, despite being benched in the 2–1 semi-final victory over UAE three days earlier. In the 42nd minute Šulla conceded a controversial goal; an attempted pass to Róbert Mazáň went straight to the foot of Teerasil Dangda, who found Jakkaphan Kaewprom, who enjoyed a de facto empty net to score to - 2–1.

Honours
Slovan Bratislava
Fortuna Liga (4): 2018–19, 2019–20, 2020–21, 2021–22
Slovnaft Cup (3): 2017–18, 2019–20, 2020–21

References

External links
FK Senica profile 

1991 births
Living people
People from Myjava
Sportspeople from the Trenčín Region
Slovak footballers
Slovakia youth international footballers
Slovakia under-21 international footballers
Slovakia international footballers
Association football goalkeepers
FK Senica players
Spartak Myjava players
ŠK Slovan Bratislava players
3. Liga (Slovakia) players
Slovak Super Liga players
2. Liga (Slovakia) players